Beca Group Limited (generally referred to as Beca) is one of the largest employee-owned professional services consultancy firms in the Asia-Pacific. The company has more than 3,800 staff working across 23 offices around the globe, with headquarters located in Auckland, New Zealand.

History
Beca was founded in 1920 by Arthur Gray on his return to New Zealand after World War I, where he purchased an engineering practice that would later become Gray and Watts, then Gray Watts & Beca. A merger with Wellington firm Hollings & Ferner in 1968 formed Beca, Carter, Hollings & Ferner, with the firm eventually known as Beca Group Ltd.

The company's name reflects the contribution of George Beca, CBE, DFC, D.Eng (Hon) (1921–2001), who joined the partnership of Gray and Watts in the early 1950s and led the firm for many years.

Beca has had several name changes following amalgamations. Beca Steven existed from 1989 to 2001 after amalgamation of Beca Carter Hollings & Ferner with Steven Fitzmaurice & Partners.

Awards

Beca was named the Best Provider to Power & Utilities sector at the 2019 Financial Review Client Choice Awards.

2018

 Best Consulting Engineering Firm (revenue > $200 million)
 Best Provider to the Government & Community sector, joint win
 Best Provider to the Power & Utilities sector
 Most Client-focused Practitioner – Hamish Denize

2017

Best Professional Services Firm (revenue > $200 million), joint win
 Best Consulting Engineering Firm (revenue > $200 million), joint win
 Market Leader: New Zealand

2015

 Market Leader
 Best New Zealand firm
 Best Provider to the Power & Utilities sector
 Best Professional Services sector provider
 Best Property sector provider

See also
Sir Ron Carter, former Chairman of Beca

References

External links
Beca Website

Engineering companies of Singapore
Engineering companies of New Zealand
Engineering companies of Australia
Employee-owned companies
Technology companies established in 1918
Consulting firms established in 1918